The 2019 Liga 3 was the third season of the Liga 3 under its current name, the fourth season under its current league structure, and the only amateur league football competition in Indonesia.

Persijap defeated PSKC 3–1 in the final at the Pakansari Stadium to won their first Liga 3 title.

Teams

Team changes
The following teams changed division from the 2018 season.

Overview

Player regulations
Unlike previous seasons, teams are not allowed to use senior players. Players born on or after 1 January 1997 are eligible to compete in this league.

Qualifying round
Qualifying round for national round is divided into 2 routes:
 Regional route (consist of representatives from 34 provinces). First, each province held their provincial league followed by unlimited amateur teams with different competition format. Then qualified teams from provincial league are competing in their respective region to earn 26 slots in national round.
 Pre-national route is featured by six relegated teams from 2018 Liga 2 and 10 teams that qualified for the second round last season. Six teams will be qualified for national round from this route.

Regional route

Province round
These teams are the representatives from their provincial league to be competing in regional round.

Regional round

Pre-national route

National round
A total of 32 teams will be competing in this round.

First round
In this first round, 32 teams divided into eight groups (4 groups in West region and 4 groups in East region). Each group played a home tournament basis. First round was played from 12–16 December 2019. Winner and runner-up of each group advanced to the second round.

West region

Group A
 Tiga Naga hosted this group at Tumpal Sinaga Stadium and Kaharudin Nasution Stadium, Pekanbaru.

|}

Group B
 PSSI chose to hold this group at Haji Agus Salim Stadium and BBC Batuang Taba Stadium, Padang.

|}

Group C
 PSKC hosted this group at Siliwangi Stadium, Bandung and Jalak Harupat Stadium, Bandung Regency.

|}

Group D
 Persiba Bantul hosted this group at Sultan Agung Stadium and Dwi Windu Stadium, Bantul.

|}

East region

Group E
 Persijap hosted this group at Gelora Bumi Kartini Stadium and Kamal Djunaedi Stadium, Jepara.

|}

Group F
 Putra Sinar Giri hosted this group at Gelora Joko Samudro Stadium and Semen Gresik Stadium, Gresik Regency.

|}

Group G
 Semeru hosted this group at Gelora Supriyadi Stadium and Gelora Bumi Penataran Stadium, Blitar.

|}

Group H
 Perseta hosted this group at Brawijaya Stadium, Kediri and Rejoagung Stadium, Tulungagung Regency.

|}

Second round
The second round was featured by 16 teams which were the winners and runner-ups from each group of the first round. The second round matches were played on 19 December 2019. Each winner advanced to the third round.

Third round
In this round, eight teams divided into two groups. Each group played a home tournament basis. Third round was played from 22–26 December 2019. Three best teams of each group promoted to the Liga 2. Winner of each group also advanced to the final.

West Group
 PSKC hosted this group at Siliwangi Stadium and Arcamanik Stadium, Bandung.

|}

East Group
 Putra Sinar Giri hosted this group at Gelora Joko Samudro Stadium, Gresik Regency and Jenggolo Stadium, Sidoarjo Regency.

|}

Final

Champions

Awards
 Top Scorers: Rikza Syawali (PSKC) with nine goals.
 Best Player: Rizki Hidayat (Persijap).
 Fair Play Team: PSKC.

See also
 2019 Liga 1
 2019 Liga 2
 2018–19 Piala Indonesia

Notes

References

Liga 3
Liga 3
2019 Liga 3 (Indonesia)
Liga 3
Liga 3
Liga 3